Asaphocrita obsoletella is a moth in the family Blastobasidae which is endemic to Finland.

References

Moths described in 1947
Endemic fauna of Finland
Moths of Europe
obsoletella